Chryseobacterium ginsenosidimutans  is a Gram-negative, strictly aerobic, non-spore-forming, rod-shaped, and non-motile bacteria from the genus of Chryseobacterium which has been isolated from a field with Toxicodendron vernicifluum trees in Okcheon County in Korea.

References

External links
Type strain of Chryseobacterium ginsenosidimutans at BacDive -  the Bacterial Diversity Metadatabase

ginsenosidimutans
Bacteria described in 2011